Duster is an unincorporated community in Comanche County, Texas. According to the Handbook of Texas, the community had a population of 25 in 2000.

History
A post office called Duster was established in 1891 and remained in operation until 1927. The community was first settled in the early 1880s. It was thought to be named Duster because a man blew the dust off of a piece of paper that he picked up when the community's first settlers attended a meeting to discuss the name for the post office. Its first location was at Polecat Pond, then moved two miles north when the Texas Central Railroad built through the area. When the railroad closed, it moved back to its original location. Belle Dukes was the first postmaster. The community's population was 50 in 1940 and lost half of it in 2000.

Geography

Education
The community of Duster is served by the De Leon Independent School District.

References

Unincorporated communities in Comanche County, Texas
Unincorporated communities in Texas